Marilynia is a genus of cribellate araneomorph spiders in the family Dictynidae, and was first described by Pekka T. Lehtinen in 1967.  it contains only two species: M. bicolor and M. bicolor.

References

Araneomorphae genera
Dictynidae
Spiders of Africa
Spiders of Asia
Taxa named by Pekka T. Lehtinen